Taft Stettinius & Hollister, commonly known as "Taft", is an American, white-shoe law firm founded in Cincinnati, with offices in Cleveland, Columbus, Dayton and Delaware, Ohio; Chicago, Illinois; Denver, Colorado; Detroit, Michigan; Indianapolis, Indiana; Covington, Kentucky; Minneapolis, Minnesota; Phoenix, Arizona; and Washington, DC. Taft has been referred to as Cincinnati's most prestigious law firm.

History
Taft traces its roots back to 1885, when Worthington & Strong was founded by Judge William Worthington and Edward W. Strong. John L. Stettinius and John B. Hollister joined the firm after its founding, at which point the firm became known as Worthington, Strong, Stettinius & Hollister. In January 1923, Judge Worthington died. In the following year, a young firm headed by Robert A. Taft and Charles P. Taft II, sons of former President William Howard Taft, joined the older firm to become Taft Stettinius & Hollister LLP.

In 1947, the firm's labor department, led by J. Mack Swigert, was instrumental in helping Robert Taft, who had become a United States Senator, draft and pass the groundbreaking Taft–Hartley Act that regulated labor unions.

More recently, the firm is known for its work representing West Virginians in the environmental litigation against DuPont beginning in the 1990s, which was the subject of the 2019 film Dark Waters.

Since the 1980s, the firm's expansion beyond Cincinnati has been accomplished with the aid of strategic mergers with local firms with its various branch offices, including Kelley, McCann, and Livingston of Cleveland in 2001, Sommer Barnard of Indianapolis in 2008, Kahn Kleinman of Cleveland in 2008,  Chester, Wilcox, and Saxbe of Columbus in 2012, and Shefsky and Froelich of Chicago in 2014. On August 29, 2019, partners at Briggs & Morgan of Minneapolis voted to merge with Taft. The merger became effective January 1, 2020. In February 2021, Taft opened an office in Washington, DC. On December 31, 2022, Taft opened an office in Detroit, Michigan through a merger with Jaffe Raitt Heuer & Weiss.

Practice areas

The firm's practice areas include business and finance, business restructuring, bankruptcy and creditor rights, domestic relations, employment, environmental, gaming, government contracts, health and life sciences, higher education, intellectual property, labor relations, litigation, pharmaceutical and life sciences litigation, private client, public finance, real estate, tax, technology services and more. Taft employs over 800 attorneys following its 2022 merger with Jaffe Raitt Heuer & Weiss.

Notable attorneys
 Robert Bilott, environmental lawyer
 John Cranley, Mayor of Cincinnati (2013–2022)
 Peter Deegan, United States Attorney for the Northern District of Iowa (2017–2021)
 Virginia Emerson Hopkins, Senior U.S. District Judge for the Northern District of Alabama
 Sarah Morrison, U.S. District Judge for the Southern District of Ohio (2019–present) and Administrator for the Ohio Bureau of Workers' Compensation (2016–2019)
 John B. Nalbandian, U.S. Circuit Judge for the Sixth Circuit
 Caleb Nelson, Emerson G. Spies Distinguished Professor of Law at the University of Virginia School of Law
 Charles Phelps Taft II, Mayor of Cincinnati (1955–1957)
 Charles R. Saxbe, former member of the Ohio House of Representatives (1975-1982) and 1982 Republican candidate for Ohio Attorney General
 Robert A. Taft, U.S. Senator from Ohio (1939–1953)
 Robert Taft Jr., U.S. Senator from Ohio (1971–1976), U.S. Representative from Ohio (1963–1965; 1967–1971)

References

External links 

 
 Organizational Profile on the National Law Review

Law firms based in Cincinnati
Law firms established in 1885
1885 establishments in Ohio